Kamno Brdo is a small settlement in the hills above Višnja Gora in the Municipality of Ivančna Gorica in central Slovenia. The area is part of the historical region of Lower Carniola and is now included in the Central Slovenia Statistical Region.

References

External links

Kamno Brdo on Geopedia

Populated places in the Municipality of Ivančna Gorica